Amarkantak (NLK Amarakaṇṭaka) is a pilgrim town and a Nagar Panchayat in Anuppur, Madhya Pradesh, India. The Amarkantak region is a unique natural heritage area and is the meeting point of the Vindhya and the Satpura Ranges, with the Maikal Hills being the fulcrum. This is where the Narmada River, the Son River and Johilla River (tributary of Son) originate.

15th-century Indian mystic and poet Kabir is said to have meditated on Kabir Chabutra, located in the town of Amarkantak, and is also called the platform of Kabir.

Etymology
Amarakantaka is a combination of two Sanskrit words, amara (immortal) and kantaka (obstruction or thorn).  The poet Kalidas has mentioned it as Amarakuta, which later became Amarakantaka.

Location

Roads running through Rewa, Shahdol, Anuppur, Jabalpur, Katni, Bilaspur and Gaurella connect it. The nearest railway stations are Pendra road and Anuppur. The nearest airport is Bilaspur Airport (120 km).

Demographics

Per the 2011 India census, Amarkantak has a population of 8,416 of which 4,514 are males and 3,902 are females. The female sex ratio is 864 against a state average of 931. Moreover, the child sex ratio in Amarkantak is around 931 compared to Madhya Pradesh's state average of 918. Literacy rate of Amarkantak city is 80.20%, higher than the state average of 69.32%. Male literacy is around 88.06% and the female literacy rate is 71.02%. 95.51% of the population follow Hinduism.

Religious significance 
Amarkantak is known as the king of pilgrimages, or Tirthraj, because the town has many temples and holy places. It is narrated in the Hindu scriptures like the Puranas that Amarkantak is the place where celestial beings, sages and others obtained spiritual powers.  
 Ancient temples of Kalachuri period: The ancient temples of Kalachuri period (famously known as Trimukhi Temple) are in the south of Narmada Kund, just behind it. These were built by Kalachuri Maharaja Karnadeva (1041–1073 AD.)
 Sarvodaya Jain temple
 The Shri Yantra Mandir in Amarkantak is in the form of a Maha Meru which is a three-dimensional representation of the Shree Yantra or Shri Chakra. This temple is located on the hallowed land that is the birthplace of the sacred Narmada River in Amarkantak, Annupur District, Madhya Pradesh.

Flora and fauna

There are greater than 600 species of flora found in Amarkantak. It also has many medicinal flora and some of which include Boswellia serrata, Terminalia chebula, Hedychium coronarium, and Curcuma caesia. The Achanakmar Wildlife Sanctuary, is located at a distance of no more than 40 km from the town of Amarkantak in the state of Chhattisgarh on the road to Bilaspur. The forest belt in Amarkantak is a part of Achanakmar-Amarkantak Biosphere Reserve. The forests of Amarkantak are linked with the forests of Kanha National Park. Amarkantak falls on the Kanha-Achanakmar Corridor, a hilly region covered with dense forests. Kanha and Achanakmar are both conserved wildlife parks in India famous for Bengal tigers.

Pinus caribaea, known as tropical pine, was planted in Amarkantak in 1968 on advice of Forest Research Institute, Dehradun on the recommendations of National Commission on Agriculture looking to the future demand of quality pulpwood. This work was undertaken under a World Bank Technical Assistance Project by clearing natural sal forests. The naturalists and environmentalists in India raised controversy over it; ultimately the project of tropical pine plantation was abolished.

Educational institutions

The Indira Gandhi National Tribal University was established in Amarkantak by an Act of Parliament in 2007. It was created to promote and provide higher education and research in various aspects of tribal communities. The Jawahar Navodaya Vidyalaya was established in 1987 to provide education for the rural young.

References

External links

 Amarkantak : Map
 Anuppur : Official

Geography of Madhya Pradesh
Hindu pilgrimage sites in India
Hindu holy cities
Cities and towns in Anuppur district
Tourism in Madhya Pradesh